The West Coast Eagles (abbreviated as Eagles) is an AFL Women's team based in Perth, Western Australia.

The team is associated with the West Coast Eagles (AFL Men's) team and in September 2017 was granted a license by the AFL to compete in the league from the start of the 2020 season. The team shares home games between Lathlain Park, Perth Stadium and Leederville Oval.

Squad

Season summaries

^ Denotes the ladder was split into two conferences. Figure refers to the club's overall finishing position in the home-and-away season.

References

AFL Women's clubs
West Coast Eagles
Australian rules football clubs in Western Australia